Solomon Islands English is the dialect of English spoken by Solomon Islanders.

Phonological features
Solomon Islands English has many features, especially in the phonology, that show the influence of local languages. It is also influenced by Australian English through the RAMSI program.

Consonant variations
Solomon Island English is non-rhotic.

The Letter r tends to be a tap [ɾ] or a trill [r] in Solomon Island English.

The interdental fricatives /θ/ and /ð/ are often realized as [t̪] and [d̪].

Vowel variations
:  = 
:  = 
:  or  =  or 
:  = 
:  or  =  or 
:  = 
:  = 
:  or  =  or 
:  = 
:  =  or 
:  or  =  or 
:  or  =  or 
:  or  =  or 
:  = 
:  = 
:  or  =  or 
:  =  or 
:  or  =  or 
:  = 
:  = 
:  = 
:  =  or 
:  = 
:  or  =  or 
:  = 
:  or  =  or

References

A Handbook of Varieties of English - Edgar W. Schneider
A Handbook of World Englishes - Blackwell Publishing

Dialects of English
English
Oceanian dialects of English